State Route 169 (SR 169) is a state highway in the U.S. state of California that is separated into two distinct segments by undeveloped areas in the Yurok Indian Reservation in Del Norte and Humboldt counties. The western segment runs from U.S. Route 101 near Klamath to Klamath Glen, while the eastern segment goes from Wautec Village to State Route 96 near Weitchpec.

Route description

The route begins at U.S. Route 101 near Klamath and after a discontinuity from Klamath Glen (near the McBeth Airport) to Johnsons via the Yurok Indian Reservation, resumes at the town of Wautec. The highway continues through Pecwan before the curving road heads southeast and passes through Martins Ferry after several miles. SR 169 ends at State Route 96 near Weitchpec. The entire route is within the Yurok Indian Reservation.

SR 169 is not part of the National Highway System, a network of highways that are considered essential to the country's economy, defense, and mobility by the Federal Highway Administration.

Major intersections

See also

References

External links

California @ AARoads.com - State Route 169
Caltrans: Route 169 highway conditions
California Highways: SR 169

169
State Route 169
State Route 169